A list of films produced in South Korea in 1970:

References

External links
1970 in South Korea

 1970-1979 at www.koreanfilm.org

1970
South Korean
1970 in South Korea